The 1956 BYU Cougars football team was an American football team that represented Brigham Young University (BYU) as a member of the Skyline Conference during the 1956 NCAA University Division football season. In their first season under head coach Hal Kopp, the Cougars compiled an overall record of 2–7–1 with a mark of 1–5–1 against conference opponents, finished seventh in the Skyline, and were outscored by a total of 232 to 147.

The team's statistical leaders included Carroll Johnston with 945 passing yards and 1,025 yards of total offense, Steve Campora with 259 rushing yards and 24 points, and Burt Bullock with 291 receiving yards.

Schedule

References

BYU
BYU Cougars football seasons
BYU Cougars football